Nightfly was a short-lived British rock band formed in late 1984. Most of its members had enjoyed success with earlier bands.

Originally known as Heyday, the band was managed by Bob Young and Colin Johnson. Nightfly played some clubs in February 1985, including a performance at the Marquee Club, and recorded demos produced by John Entwistle.

Members
Spencer James - vocals, previously with The First Class
Mickey Simmonds - keyboards, previously with John Coghlan's Diesel
Micky Moody - guitar, previously with Whitesnake
Zak Starkey - drums, son of Ringo Starr, later with The Who.
Boz Burrell - bass, previously with Bad Company

References

English rock music groups
Musical groups established in 1984